Peace on Earth  may refer to:

"Peace on Earth, good will to men", a phrase from the Biblical annunciation to the shepherds
World peace

Music

Albums
Peace on Earth (Casting Crowns album), 2008
Peace on Earth (Kitaro album), 1996
Peace on Earth (Matt Dusk album), 2004
Peace on Earth (EP), by Crystal Lewis, 2009

Songs
"Peace on Earth" (U2 song), 2000
"Peace on Earth/Little Drummer Boy", by David Bowie and Bing Crosby, 1982
"Peace on Earth", by Big Daddy Weave from Christ Is Come, 2009
"Peace on Earth", by Keke Wyatt from Who Knew?, 2010
"Peace on Earth", by Mike Oldfield from The Millennium Bell, 1999

Other media
Peace on Earth (film), a 1939 cartoon short directed by Hugh Harman
 Peace on Earth (Lipchitz), 1969 sculpture in Los Angeles, California, U.S.
Peace on Earth (novel), a 1987 novel by Stanisław Lem
Superman: Peace on Earth, a 1998 graphic novel by Paul Dini and Alex Ross

See also
Pacem in terris, a 1963 papal encyclical issued by Pope John XXIII